The 2018 Australian Women's Curling Championship was held from 7 to 10 June 2018 at the Naseby Curling Club in Naseby, New Zealand. The winners of this championship will represent Australia at the 2018 Pacific-Asia Curling Championships.

At the same time 2018 Australian Men's Curling Championship and 2018 Australian Mixed Curling Championship were held at the Naseby Curling Club.

Teams
The teams are listed as follows:

Triple Knock-out

Stage 1

Stage 2

Stage 3

Final standings

See also
 2018 Australian Men's Curling Championship
 2018 Australian Mixed Curling Championship
 2018 Australian Mixed Doubles Curling Championship
 2018 Australian Junior Curling Championship
 2018 Australian Senior Curling Championship

References

2018 in women's curling
Curling Championship
Curling Championship
2018
June 2018 sports events in Oceania
Sport in Otago
Curling competitions in New Zealand